The Cape Horn Current is a cold water current that flows west-to-east around Cape Horn caused by the intensification of the West Wind Drift as it rounds the cape.

See also 
 
 

Currents of the Atlantic Ocean
Currents of the Pacific Ocean